NNCL may refer to: